This is a list of undefeated NCAA Division I football teams, which describes all teams that finished a college football season in the NCAA's Division I, or historic equivalent, without any losses.

Division I Football Bowl Subdivision
NCAA  Division I Football Bowl Subdivision (FBS) is the highest division of play in college football. However this nomenclature and these categories of divisional play have only existed since 2006 and 1978, respectively. Prior to the formation of the NCAA in 1906, there was no differentiation between the level of play from one college to another, and thus all intercollegiate teams can be thought of as having played in the same division. Likewise, even after the formation of the NCAA, there was no differentiation into divisions until 1956, when play was separated in the upper "University" division and lower "Collegiate" division. In 1973, a three division reorganization occurred placing teams into NCAA Division I (highest), Division II, or Division III (lowest). In 1978, Division I was further subdivided into Division I-A (highest) and Division I-AA. In 2006, these subdivisions were renamed Division I Football Bowl Subdivision (FBS) and Football Championship Subdivision (FCS), respectively.

The following categories represent the historical equivalents of the highest level of play over the history of college football, and the subsequent tables list the teams for each season that went undefeated while competing in these highest categories:

uncategorized (pre-NCAA) 1869 to 1905
NCAA 1906 to 1955
NCAA University Division from 1956 until 1972
NCAA Division I from 1973 to 1977
NCAA Division I-A from 1978 to 2005
NCAA Division I Football Bowl Subdivision (FBS) from 2006–present

Undefeated and untied
These teams finished the season having won every game in which they played, thus completing a "perfect season".

Pre-1900

1900 to present

note: In 1917, 1918, 1943, and 1944, football teams from military training facilities competed alongside college programs

Undefeated with ties
These teams all finished the season with no losses, but with ties. This result has been impossible to achieve since the introduction of overtime to college football in 1996 which eliminated ties.

note: In 1917, 1918, 1943, and 1944, football teams from military training facilities competed alongside college programs
note: In 1996, the NCAA eliminated ties with a new overtime system

Teams with multiple undefeated seasons
Teams ordered by the number of undefeated seasons in the top division.  Teams in italics no longer compete in Division I FBS.

Coaches with multiple undefeated seasons

Coaches ordered by the number of undefeated seasons in the top division.

Division I Football Championship Subdivision
This section covers teams that competed in the second tier of Division I since it was split in 1978:
Division I-AA from 1978 to 2005
Football Championship Subdivision (FCS) from 2006

Note that Division I FCS features a single-elimination championship tournament, reducing the likelihood of multiple teams finishing the season with undefeated records.  However, several conferences voluntarily do not compete in the tournament, thus there exists a chance to have multiple undefeated teams in the same year.

In both lists in this section, teams in bold competed in the I-AA or FCS playoffs, thereby winning the national title.

Undefeated and untied
These teams finished the season with no losses or ties in Division I-AA or FCS football since 1978.

Undefeated with ties
These teams finished the season with no losses, but with ties, in Division I-AA or FCS football since 1978.

See also
 List of major college football winless seasons

References

Lists of college football team records